Min Zhu (朱敏; born 1948) is an American entrepreneur and philanthropist. Zhu is the co-founder and former president and chief technical officer of WebEx.

Biography 
Born in Ningbo, Zhu received his bachelor's degree from Zhejiang University. He also holds an M.S. in Engineering from Stanford University. He developed his technology expertise at the IBM Scientific Center in Palo Alto, California. He was also the deputy to the chief technical officer of Price Waterhouse and the vice president of Expert Edge, a software design company. In 1991, Zhu co-founded Future Labs, one of the first companies to produce multi-point document collaboration software. Quarterdeck acquired Future Labs in 1996, and Zhu went on to co-found WebEx with Subrah Iyar.

On May 13, 2005, Zhu resigned from WebEx and left the United States. Zhu continues to serve as a science and technology advisor to the municipal government of San Jose, a member of the University of California President's Board on Science and Innovation, a board director of the Hua Yuan Science and Technology Association and a partner at New Enterprise Associates.

In September 2005, NEA announced plans to back Chinese venture firm Northern Light Venture Capital. This venture fund is raising a first, $100 million fund this fall. NEA general partner Scott Sandell described his firm's relationship to Northern Light as akin to a "special LP," whereby Northern Light will receive part of its institutional backing from NEA and provide NEA with deal flow. The new firm, founded by Zhu along with Chinese entrepreneurs Feng Deng and Yan Ke, will share office space in China with NEA venture partner Xiaodong Jiang.

Min Zhu is the father of Erin Zhu, CEO of OpenNote. Erin is a graduate of Stanford Graduate School of Business, where she was a Sloan Fellow. She and her husband Blixa Bargeld are featured in the 2010 book Designing Media written by Bill Moggridge about 37 of the most influential people in the media industry. Blixa Bargeld is the founder and lead vocalist of the German band Einstürzende Neubauten. The couple resides in San Francisco, Beijing and Berlin with their daughter.

Retirement 
On May 13, 2005, WebEx announced that Zhu was stepping down as WebEx's CTO and retiring to China, where he would serve as a "WebEx Fellow."

References

External links 
 University of California President's Board on Science and Innovation listing
 WebEx press release concerning Zhu's resignation from WebEx and his departure from the U.S.A.
 Neubauten Website

1948 births
Businesspeople from Ningbo
Living people
Zhejiang University alumni
Stanford University alumni
American businesspeople
Stanford Sloan Fellows
Chinese computer scientists
American people of Chinese descent